Mehdi Agha Mohammadi is an Iranian footballer. He played for Naft Tehran in Iran Pro League.

Club career
In 2010, Agha Mohammadi joined Pas Hamedan F.C. after spending the previous season at Tarbiat Yazd F.C. in the Azadegan League.

 Assist Goals

References

Iranian footballers
Homa F.C. players
Living people
Pas players
F.C. Aboomoslem players
Tarbiat Yazd players
Naft Tehran F.C. players
Association football midfielders
Year of birth missing (living people)